Kahar Barat (born 1950) is a Uyghur American historian known for his work on Buddhism and Islam in Xinjiang.

Kahar Barat was born in Yili in 1950. He earned his M.A. degree in Turkology from the Central University for Ethnic Minorities (Minzu University of China) in Beijing; he received his  Ph.D. from Harvard University in 1993.

 He later taught at Yale University and other institutions.

In 2000, Kahar Barat published an annotated English edition of parts of "The Uygur Turkic biography of the seventh-century Chinese Buddhist Pilgrim Xuanzang".

Barat's recent book, named Maymaq Uyghurlar ("Warped Uyghurs", in Uyghur) discusses the plight of Xinjiang's artists, who find themselves in the position of packaging the Uyghur culture for consumption by outside audiences.

References

Uyghurs
Historians of China
American Turkologists
Living people
1950 births
Harvard University alumni
Yale University faculty
Minzu University of China alumni
People's Republic of China emigrants to the United States
American people of Uyghur descent
21st-century American historians
21st-century American male writers
American male non-fiction writers